Lake Sentani is a tropical, shallow, and at low-altitude open lake located at the northeast extremity of the Jayapura Regency in the Indonesian province of Papua, about  from the provincial capital, Jayapura City. It is located just to the south of the town of Sentani.

The lake, which is considered by the local population as the home of the rainbows, is part of the Cyclops Strict Nature Reserve and contains several endemic species of fish.

Hydrology

The lake outflows into the Jafuri and Tami rivers to the Pacific Ocean near the Papua New Guinea border.

Geology

Lake Sentani, the best studied of Irian Jaya lakes, is relatively stable and intact.  It is widely believed to have evolved by the tectonic damming and uplift of an arm of the sea, but such a connection has not been demonstrated yet.

Natural history
Preliminary bottom sediment samples from the eastern part of the lake have yielded sparse populations of arcellacean microfauna, dominated by Centropyxid types. In other parts of the world these species are found associated with brackish or polluted water conditions, raising the possibility that there is residual salinity in the deeper parts of the lake.

It may be small, but it harbors 34 species of fish, of which 13 are resident natives, 8 anadromous and 13 introduced. Besides having its own species of rainbowfish (Sentani rainbowfish and red rainbowfish), Lake Sentani is also home to two other fish species that cannot be found anywhere else, the Sentani gudgeon and Sentani goby. Fish are extensively raised in ponds and cages around the perimeter of the lake and the introduction of species (particularly carp and tilapia) has been both accidental and intentional.

In this part of the world and at this latitude rainbows are visible only after a hard rain, but in Lake Sentani they are visible all the time, at least, by seeing the Sentani rainbowfish that, along with many others, are unique to this lake.

History
During World War II the United States Navy built a naval base at the Lake as part of Naval Base Hollandia. The base operated from 1944 to 1945.

Economy
Many of the Sentani people, who inhabit the islands, perimeter and environs of the lake, still have a traditional subsistence economy based on fishing and sago harvesting.  This has been sustainable for centuries but local reports suggest that catch yields have diminished in recent years.  Whether this is a result of overfishing (as a result of population growth and/or market pressure), pollution or introduction of foreign species is not established.  Many of the residents occupy dwellings built on posts over the lake, which thus serves as a depository for sewage, leading to locally high coliform bacteria counts, but also to nutrient enrichment.  Water hyacinth (Eichornia crassipes), introduced since the early 1970s, has become a major plant pest and may contribute to the decline of some species.

Much of the mountainous terrain between the north shore of the lake and the ocean falls within the Cyclops Strict Nature Reserve.  The future management of the reserve and buffer zone, and the environmental quality of the lake, are strongly interdependent.  Recently a major reforestation project of grassland on the slopes surrounding the lake has been initiated, with the support of forest companies operating in Papua.  This ecoregion is located within one of the most populated areas of New Guinea, but it is threatened by overfishing, the introduction of new species, which could be harmful to the endemic species in this lake. and aquaculture.  A major sustainable development issues for the inhabitants of the lake and surroundings is the existing proposal to build a hydroelectric power plant through a dam placed on the Jafuri river.  Several feasibility and environmental impact studies have been published, but the cost/benefit consequences of this project have not been released yet.

Notable attractions 

On a hill at the northwest of the Lake, there is a megalithic and petroglyphic place called Doyo Lama. Some archaeologists think that it was built under Micronesian influence.

See also 
Sentani languages

References

Notes

Bibliography

Related article
 

Related articles
 
 

Related article

Further reading

Parts
 
 
 
 
 
 
 
 
 
 

Sentani
Landforms of Papua (province)